Bryan T. Donovan is an American actor/writer/producer who appeared on the first season of Thintervention with Jackie Warner, a docu-series about health and fitness on BRAVO.

Early life
Donovan was born in Sterling Heights, Michigan, a suburb of Detroit and graduated high school from the prestigious Interlochen Arts Academy where he majored in theatre.

Career

Television
Donovan’s first television job was a recurring role on the ABC soap opera All My Children. Other television appearances include Law & Order, Medium, Nite Tales; The Series, Boardwalk Empire, and Blue Bloods.

Film
Donovan starred and produced his first comedy short, Steeling Magnolias which premiered at Outfest and has since traversed the world in various film festivals.  Donovan teamed with Steakhaus Productions in 2008 and produced several films including Weather Girl, 6 Month Rule, Annie in the Aisle of Irma, The Rise, and Church & State.  
As an actor, Donovan has appeared in the films Annie in The Aisle of Irma, Sunset Stories and My Eleventh.

Filmography

Stage
New York City productions include Strike Up the Band, Li'l Abner and On A Clear Day at Encores! City Center. He originated the roles of Bernard in Dream True at the Vineyard Theatre and Wil in Fanny Hill at the Goodspeed Opera House.  Donovan made his Broadway debut in the play Wrong Mountain, the last American play of the century to open on the Great White Way. He played the role of Greg in the Los Angeles production of It's Just Sex at the Zepher Theatre.  In the fall of 2006, Donovan made his stand-up debut at Caroline's Comedy Club in New York City.

Personal life
Donovan resides in NYC.

References
 https://www.imdb.com/name/nm2330912/
 https://web.archive.org/web/20100912120404/http://www.poptower.com/bryan-t-donovan-thintervention.htm
 http://bryantdonovan.com/
 https://web.archive.org/web/20110716133522/http://steakhaus.com/wordpress/aboutus/bryan-donovan/
 http://www.curtainup.com/dreamtru.html
 http://bravotvfan.wordpress.com/
 https://web.archive.org/web/20120629152059/http://www.nycitycenter.org/content/stage/enc_prev.aspx
 http://www.ibdb.com/person.php?id=76334
 https://web.archive.org/web/20110109032018/http://articles.sfgate.com/keyword/high-society
 http://broadwayworld.com/shows/cast.php?showid=8009

External links
 Official website
 

1973 births
Living people
People from Sterling Heights, Michigan
American gay actors
Male actors from Los Angeles
21st-century LGBT people